Heffern is a surname. Notable people with the surname include:

John A. Heffern (born 1953), American diplomat
Meghan Heffern (born 1983), Canadian actress